The Republic of Tamrash, was a short-lived self-governing administrative structure of the Pomaks, living in the Tamrash region of the Rhodope Mountains. It existed from 1878 to 1886.

Geography 

The territory spanned over the area locked in the upper valley of the Vacha River and most of its tributaries. The rebel territory initially consisted of 17 villages but its number increased up to 21 in 1880. Some of those villages were Trigrad, Mugla, Beden, Mihalkovo, Skobelevo, Churukovo and Devin.

History

The republic survived until 1886, when Eastern Rumelia was incorporated into Bulgaria. Then the area was returned to the Ottoman Empire.

See also 
 Provisional Government of Western Thrace

References

External links 
 Ercan Çokbankir – FİLİBE TIMRAŞTAN KONYA TIMRAŞA

Literature 

 

Former republics
1878 in Bulgaria
1886 in Bulgaria
Pomaks
Rhodope Mountains
Smolyan Province
States and territories established in 1878
States and territories disestablished in 1886